Big Chicken Hollow is a valley in San Mateo County, California. It contains a fork of Honsinger Creek.

References

See also
Little Chicken Hollow
List of watercourses in the San Francisco Bay Area

Valleys of San Mateo County, California
Valleys of California
Tributaries of Pescadero Creek